Chen Mei-ling (born 13 June 1965), better known by her stage name Fang Wen-lin, is a Taiwanese singer and actress. In the 1980s she was part of the popular girl group Feiying Trio (飛鷹三姝) with Annie Yi and Donna Chiu.

Fang released 10 Mandopop albums from 1987 to 1998. She has since focused on her acting career, and won Golden Bell Award for Best Actress in a Miniseries or Television Film in 2005.

Filmography

Film

TV Dramas

Awards and nominations

References

External links

 
 

20th-century Taiwanese actresses
21st-century Taiwanese actresses
Taiwanese film actresses
Taiwanese television actresses
Taiwanese Mandopop singers
1965 births
People from Changhua County
Living people
20th-century Taiwanese women singers